Inge Margot Kahl Pingel (born 9 January 1961 Puerto Varas)  is a Chilean  engineer and television presenter.  From 1992 and 2002, she was host of the Good Morning Everyone program.

Life 
She graduated from University of Chile. She was a model for Paula magazine . In 1984, she was a presenter at 60 Minutos. In 1992, she was a presenter for Buenos Días a Todos.  In 2002, she was a presenter for Por fin es lunes.

In 2008 she was manager of Corporate Affairs of Sonda. In 2010, she was manager of Corporate Affairs and Corporate Social Responsibility at McDonald's Chile.

References 

1961 births
Living people
Chilean television presenters
Chilean people of German descent